Järvo Tandre (also Rudolf Stockeby; 22 October 1899 Väinjärve Parish, Järva County – 30 August 1943 Usollag prison camp, Perm Oblast) was an Estonian politician. He was a member of VI Riigikogu (its Chamber of Deputies).

References

1899 births
1943 deaths
Members of the Riigivolikogu
Estonian people who died in Soviet detention